Ralph Myers is an Australian theatre designer and director, and the former artistic director of Sydney's Belvoir.

In 2005 and 2006 Myers was the resident designer at the Sydney Theatre Company; he was later an associate artist at Belvoir. His appointment as artistic director at Belvoir was announced in 2009 and he replaced outgoing Artistic Director Neil Armfield at the beginning of 2011. Myers announced his intention to step down in June 2014, and departed at the end of 2015.

Credits
He has directed Frankenstein for Sydney Theatre Company, and Private Lives and Peter Pan for Belvoir.
His design credits include
 Sweet Phoebe
Griffin Theatre Company
 Tango
Rock'n Roll Circus
 Inferno
Rock 'n Roll Circus
 Borderlines
Griffin Theatre Company/Riverina Theatre Company/Stable Theatre/Playhouse Wagga Wagga
 The 7 Stages of Grieving
Sydney Theatre Company
 Blue Heart
Siren Theatre Company
 The Cosmonaut’s Last Message to the Woman He Once Loved in the Former Soviet Union 
Belvoir
 Knives in Hens
B Sharp
 The Soldier's Tale
Australian Chamber Orchestra/Bell Shakespeare
 Endgame
Sydney Theatre Company/Sydney Festival
 Frozen
Melbourne Theatre Company
 Wonderlands
HotHouse Theatre/Stables Theatre
 Conversations with the Dead
Belvoir
 The Fever
Belvoir
 Morph
Sydney Theatre Company
 Frozen
Melbourne Theatre Company production for Sydney Theatre Company
 Eora Crossing
Legs on the Wall/Sydney Festival
 Dinner
Melbourne Theatre Company
 The Spook
Belvoir
 Far Away
Sydney Theatre Company
 Cruel and Tender
Melbourne Theatre Company
 The Little Piggy
Sydney Theatre Company
 Ray's Tempest
Belvoir
 Boy Gets Girl
Sydney Theatre Company
 Dissident, Goes Without Saying
Blueprints for Sydney Theatre Company
 Mother Courage and Her Children
Sydney Theatre Company
 Lost Echo Parts I and II
Sydney Theatre Company
 A Kind of Alaska/Reunion
Sydney Theatre Company
 Parramatta Girls
Belvoir
 Enlightenment
Melbourne Theatre Company
 A Midsummer Night's Dream
Sydney Theatre Company
 Othello
Bell Shakespeare
 Toy Symphony
Belvoir
 Blackbird
Sydney Theatre Company
 La Boheme
New Zealand Opera
 Two Faced Bastard
Chunky Move
 A Street Car Named Desire
Sydney Theatre Company
 The City
Sydney Theatre Company
 Cosi Fan Tutte
Opera Australia
 Peter Grimes
Opera Australia
 Measure for Measure
Belvoir
The Wild Duck
Belvoir
 The Seagull
Belvoir
 Summer of the Seventeenth Doll
Belvoir
 Caligula
English National Opera
 Death of a Salesman
Belvoir
 Hamlet
Belvoir
 The Government Inspector
Belvoir
 Is This Thing On?
Belvoir

References 

1979 births
Living people
Place of birth missing (living people)
Australian theatre directors
People educated at Newtown High School of the Performing Arts
Australian scenic designers
Australian costume designers